
Anziza Salema is a Salegy Baôsa singer whose personal and musical roots lie in the Sakalava Boina culture of Madagascar.

Discography
 Mahaiza Mipetraka (1999)
 Ameolalana (2004)

Compilations
 Talents de Madagascar Vol. 1 (2006)

External links
 Official website

References

Year of birth missing (living people)
Living people
21st-century Malagasy women singers
20th-century Malagasy women singers